The 2005 Baltic Cup football competition took place without one of the usual contenders in this Baltic states' championship: Estonia. Therefore, the event was reduced to a single match between Lithuania and Latvia.

Match

Lithuania vs Latvia

Winners

Statistics

Goalscorers

See also

 Balkan Cup
 Nordic Football Championship

References

External links
RSSSF
omnitel

Baltic Cup (football)
Baltic Cup
Baltic Cup
International association football competitions hosted by Lithuania